"Headline News" is a song by British band Everyday People, which was released in 1990 as the lead single from their only studio album You Wash... I'll Dry. It was written by Shaun Ward and Desi Campbell, and produced by Stewart Levine. "Headline News" reached No. 99 on the UK Singles Chart.

Critical reception
On its release, Chris Wells of New Musical Express wrote: "See for once here we are dealing with a trio of musicians whose main concern [is] how well they can write, perform and record a song based purely on musical talent. That's why "Headline News" sounds as refreshingly organic as it does." Billboard listed the single under their "new and noteworthy" section and described the song as "an uplifting and sophisticated midtempo R&B/pop jam glimmering with subtle vintage Motown nuances."

In a review of You Wash... I'll Dry, CD Review wrote: "Songs like "Headline News" fuse a strong, bouncing beat, a beboppin' brass/sax backup section and triadic vocal harmonizing (characteristic of the 1960s Motown sound) with syncopated polyrhythms and a prominent, jerky bass line (popularized in 1970s funk)." Scott Benarde of The Palm Beach Post described the song as "snappy" and "crackling".

Formats

PersonnelEveryday People Desi Campbell - lead vocals
 Lloyd T. Richards - guitar
 Shaun Ward - bass, backing vocalsProduction Stewart Levine - producer of "Headline News"
 Michael R. Hutchinson - remix of "Headline News"
 Everyday People - producers of "Keep Away from Love"
 Jeremy Allom - engineer on "Keep Away from Love"Other'
 Ellen von Unwerth - photography

Charts

References

1990 songs
1990 debut singles
SBK Records singles
Song recordings produced by Stewart Levine